The 1952 San Francisco 49ers season was the franchise's 3rd season in the National Football League and their 7th overall. They were coming off a 7–4–1 record in 1951.

The 49ers won their first five games by at least two touchdowns and had visions of playing in their first-ever NFL Championship Game. However, they lost five of their final seven games to finish at 7–5, third place in the six-team National Conference (which became the Western Conference in ).

Y. A. Tittle emerged as the starting quarterback, as he had a completion rate of 51.0% along with eleven touchdowns and 1,407 yards. Frankie Albert also had some action, completing 55.0% of his passes, along with eight TDs and 964 yards.

Joe Perry rushed for a team-high 725 yards and eight TDs, while rookie Hugh McElhenny had 684 yards on 98 attempts (7.0 yards/carry), along with six rushing TDs, while he caught 26 passes for 367 yards and earned another three touchdowns. Gordie Soltau led the club with 55 receptions for 774 yards and seven TDs.

Offseason

NFL Draft

Regular season

Schedule

Standings

Pro Bowl
San Francisco's players selected for the Pro Bowl:

References

External links
1952 49ers on Pro Football Reference
SHRP Sports

San Francisco 49ers
San Francisco 49ers seasons
San Francisco 49ers